Hypercompe laeta is a moth of the family Erebidae first described by Francis Walker in 1855. It is found in Panama and Venezuela.

References

Hypercompe
Moths described in 1855